The 4th Race of Champions was a non-Championship motor race, run to Formula One rules, held on 16 March 1969 at Brands Hatch circuit in Kent, England. The race was run over 50 laps of the circuit, and was won by Jackie Stewart in a Matra MS80.

Results

Qualifying

Race

References 
 Results at Silhouet.com 
 Results at F1 Images.de 

Race of Champions
Race of Champions (Brands Hatch)
Gold
Race of Champions